D520 is a state road in Slavonia region of Croatia, connecting the A3 motorway Babina Greda interchange to Slavonski Šamac, Babina Greda and D7.

The road, as well as all other state roads in Croatia, is managed and maintained by Hrvatske Ceste, state owned company.

Traffic volume 

The D520 state road traffic volume is not reported by Hrvatske Ceste, however they regularly count and report traffic volume on the A3 motorway Babina Greda interchange, which connects to the D520 road only, thus permitting the D520 road traffic volume to be accurately calculated. The report includes no information on ASDT volumes.

Road junctions and populated areas

See also
 A3 motorway

Sources

State roads in Croatia
Vukovar-Syrmia County
Brod-Posavina County